Big Brother (Polish: Wielki Brat) is a Polish version of the reality television franchise Big Brother produced by Endemol. The show aired from 2001 to 2002 on TVN and 2007 to 2008 on TV4.

After 11 years break, the sixth season began on 17 March 2019 on TVN 7. On the stream service Player.pl website, live stream is available from 4 premium channels straight from the Big Brother house broadcasting 16 hours a day.

Format 
Based on the original Dutch version created by Endemol, the show sees a number of "housemates", divided by gender, social backgrounds and geographical locations, locked up together in a house, where the viewing public can watch them twenty-four hours a day, and vote them out of the house as they choose.

The housemates can visit the "Dairy Room" at any time during the day, either to talk to psychologists if they need to, talk to "Big Brother", or to nominate.

The title is inspired by the George Orwell novel 1984. The novel tells of a Big Brother, head of the totalitarian state of Oceania that constantly monitors its inhabitants by the camera in an attempt to suppress their free will. The tag line of the novel is "Big Brother is watching you", which inspired the show, as it is Big Brother who now has total control over the situation in the house.

The housemates live in a house 24 hours a day, bugged by numerous cameras and microphones which capture their every move. Every week the housemates participate in tasks that determine their food budget for that week, or could even affect that week's nominations. The overall goal is to be the final surviving housemate and claim the prize fund. A PlayStation game based on this version was released in 2003.

Production

House 
In the first three seasons, the house was located in Sękocin Stary near Warsaw. In the fourth and fifth season were located in Bielany Wrocławskie. From the sixth season, the house located in the town of Gołków near Piaseczno. For the first time ever in Big Brother history, the housemates live in a proper building rather than a constructed house in a studio. The house is the same house was used in the Polish version of Top Model.

Live stream 
Since the fourth season, an internet live stream of the house was made available. From the sixth season, there are 4 channels of the live stream up to 16 hours per day on the Player.pl.

Series overview 

: Big Brother 2 was started airing with Big Brother: Ty Wybierasz on 26 August 2001, a week before the launch.

Big Brother 1

The first season of the Polish version of Big Brother.

Big Brother 2

Big Brother 3

The third season of the Polish version of Big Brother, also known as Big Brother Bitwa.

Big Brother 4.1

Big Brother 4.1, is the fourth season of Big Brother Poland. The show returned after 5 years break.

Big Brother 5

The Big Brother 5 was divided into two parts: the first part is the one with celebrity (VIP) housemates and the second part is the one with civilian housemates. The season was premiered on March 2, 2008.

Big Brother 6

The sixth season of Big Brother Polska premiered in March 2019, 11 years after the fifth season.

Big Brother 7

The seventh season of Big Brother Polska premiered on 13 September 2019.

External links
Big Brother on TVN
Big Brother 5
 Big Brother 4.1

References

 
2001 Polish television series debuts
2008 Polish television series endings
TVN (Polish TV channel) original programming
TV4 (Polish TV channel) original programming
Polish reality television series